Masoud Ebrahimzadeh is an Iranian professional football player who plays as a left back for Zob Ahan in the Persian Gulf pro league.۱۲۳

Club career
Ebrahimzadeh has spent his entire career with Tractor.

On 15 July 2014, Ebrahimzadeh joined Saipa with signing a two-year contract.

Club career statistics

 Assist Goals

Honours

Club 

 Tractor

 Persian Gulf Pro League : 2011-12 Runner up, 2012-13 Runner up
Tractor
Hazfi Cup (1): 2013–14

References
2. شکایت بازیکن تبریزی از باشگاه تراکتورسازی Retrieved in Persian www.farsnews.ir

3.  ابراهیم‌زاده:برای این بازی ۲۵روز تمرین کرده بودیم Retrieved in Persian www.varzesh3.com

4. ابراهیم‌زاده: در جام حذفی کار سخت‌تری مقابل استقلال داریم/ گل‌گهر حریف خطرناکی است Retrieved in Persian www.tasnimnews.com

5. آغاز تمرین اختصاصی مسعود ابراهیم زاده (عکس) Retrieved in Persian www.ilna.news

6. Tractor vs. Al Jazira Retrieved int.soccerway.com 26 February 2013

7. ابراهیم زاده: دلم برای فوتبال تنگ شده است Retrieved in Persian www.mehrnews.com

8. Tractor vs. Rah Ahan Retrieved int.soccerway.com 1 August 2010

External links 

 Masoud Ebrahimzadeh at PersianLeague.com
 
 
 
 
 

1989 births
Living people
Iranian footballers
Tractor S.C. players
Zob Ahan Esfahan F.C. players
People from Ahar
Saipa F.C. players
Footballers at the 2010 Asian Games
Gostaresh Foulad F.C. players
Association football defenders
Asian Games competitors for Iran